KMVU-DT (channel 26) is a television station in Medford, Oregon, United States, affiliated with the Fox network. It is owned by Imagicomm Communications alongside low-power dual MyNetworkTV/Telemundo affiliate KFBI-LD (channel 48). Both stations share studios on Crater Lake Avenue in Medford, while KMVU-DT's transmitter is located atop Mount Baldy, near Phoenix, Oregon.

History
The station was founded on August 8, 1994 by Bob and June Sheehan. The station's start-up was funded by Salmon River Communications under a leased management agreement between the Sheehans and Salmon River's CEO, Robert J. Hamacher. Prior to the station's sign on, Medford residents could only receive Fox programming via the national Foxnet service. Hamaker appointed Peter Rogers as the station's original General Manager in July 1994 after the transfer of control of the station from the Sheehans to Salmon River was approved by the Federal Communications Commission (FCC). Rogers came from KRON-TV, San Francisco's then-NBC affiliate, where he had established his credentials in television station programming, operations, production, and administration. Rogers managed KMVU from 1994 to 2004. Salmon River sold the station to Northwest Broadcasting in 1998.

In February 2019, Reuters reported that Apollo Global Management had agreed to acquire the entirety of Brian Brady's television portfolio, which it intends to merge with Cox Media Group (which Apollo is acquiring at the same time) and stations spun off from Nexstar Media Group's purchase of Tribune Broadcasting, once the purchases are approved by the FCC. In March 2019 filings with the FCC, Apollo confirmed that its newly-formed broadcasting group, Terrier Media, would acquire Northwest Broadcasting, with Brian Brady holding an unspecified minority interest in Terrier. In June 2019, it was announced that Terrier Media would instead operate as Cox Media Group, as Apollo had reached a deal to also acquire Cox's radio and advertising businesses. The transaction was completed on December 17.

On March 29, 2022, Cox Media Group announced it would sell KMVU-DT, KFBI-LD and 16 other stations to Imagicomm Communications, an affiliate of the parent company of the INSP cable channel, for $488 million; the sale was completed on August 1.

News operation
In 2006, the station began broadcasting Fox 26 First at Ten, a 10 o'clock local news program produced by KMVU competitor KOBI-TV. The newscast is currently anchored by Shellye Leggette, with meteorologist Matt Jordan handling weather.

On January 10, 2011, KMVU launched a new morning news program called Fox 26 Morning News Live at Seven. The newscast is currently anchored by Blakely McHugh and Kyle Aevermann.

Only a 10 p.m. newscast is produced and aired on the weekends. It is anchored by Madison Laberge and weather forecaster Nicole Constantino.

Technical information

Subchannels
The station's digital signal is multiplexed:

Analog-to-digital conversion
KMVU shut down its analog signal, over UHF channel 26, on February 17, 2009, the original target date in which full-power television stations in the United States were to transition from analog to digital broadcasts under federal mandate (which was later pushed back to June 12, 2009). The station's digital signal relocated from its pre-transition UHF channel 27 to channel 26.

Translators

Cable and satellite carriage disputes

Northland Cable TV (2007–2008)

On May 6, 2007, KMVU was replaced by Chico, California Fox affiliate KCVU-TV on Northland Cable Television channel 13 in both Mt. Shasta and Yreka, California. This was after KMVU and Northland could not agree to remain on the cable system. Northland also carries KCVU's sister station KRVU-LD My 21 on cable channel 2. Northland was blocked from airing Fox network programming as a result.

On May 14, 2008, the FCC issued two Notices of Apparent Liability and Forfeitures to Northland. These were a result of failing to provide thirty days notice to KMVU and cable customers that KMVU would be moved to a different channel and dropped eventually. The two NALs totaled $40,000. According to standard procedure, Northland had thirty days to either pay the fine or ask for a reduction or cancellation.

In November 2008, KMVU won the contract dispute with Northland Cable. KMVU returned to its previous channel on both Mt. Shasta and Yreka, forcing KCVU to be removed.

DirecTV (2010–2012)
KMVU underwent a carriage dispute with DirecTV, similar to a dispute between Dish Network and KDRV. This dispute threatened to blackout the 2010–2011 NFC Championship Game between the Green Bay Packers and the Chicago Bears on January 23, 2011. The 2011 Pro Bowl and Super Bowl XLV were also at risk for blackouts. The dispute was temporarily resolved.

However, on August 13, 2012, DirecTV dropped KMVU from its service and line-up. This prompted station owner Northwest Broadcasting to issue a statement regarding the issue. As a result, KMVU has started airing promos asking viewers to find other alternatives to watch their station to make their feelings known about the controversy.

On October 25, 2012, KMVU returned to DirecTV.

Dish Network (2020–present) 
On January 18, 2020, KMVU announced that a carriage dispute with Dish Network had led to a blackout after the previous carriage agreement had expired at 4 p.m. that day. As of February 2, 2020, the dispute remained unresolved, leaving Dish customers' prospects of watching Super Bowl LV in doubt.

References

External links
 
 History of Television in Southern Oregon

Television channels and stations established in 1994
1994 establishments in Oregon
MVU-DT
MeTV affiliates
Ion Television affiliates
Fox network affiliates
Imagicomm Communications